James Hobson (born February 10, 1990) known for his YouTube channel Hacksmith Industries (formerly the Hacksmith) is an engineer and YouTuber.

James is the presenter and prominent figure on the channel and has done a TEDx talk on his aspirations as an engineer. In December 2020, James was awarded a Guinness World Record for his 'lightsaber'. In July 2021, he was awarded another for the world's brightest flashlight.

Notable creations 
The Hacksmith is known for his "Make It Real" series where he and his team take fictional items and create real-life replicas, such as an exosuit or lightsaber. His gas fueled steampunk plasma lightsaber that could reach  and cut through metal was awarded a Guinness World Record for world's first retractable protosaber. The channel also does collaborations on projects with companies, such as Smarter Alloys in 2021. The channel's projects are not specifically limited to existing media however, such as when they created the previously mentioned flashlight. 

In 2019, The Hacksmith created a replica of a half-scale Tesla Cybertruck that had the same specifications as the full scale. Around the same year, they moved to a different facility with more equipment for their projects.

In 2020 through 2021, the group made their first complete set of armor based on Din Djarin's arsenal from the Disney+ streaming series The Mandalorian.

In late 2022, the group moved to another facility with more open space for testing their projects.

YouTube career

References

External links 
 

1990 births
Living people
Canadian YouTubers
Gaming YouTubers
YouTube channels launched in 2006
Guinness World Records